The Manitoba Antique Automobile Museum is a museum that is located on Trans Canada Highway 1 in Elkhorn, Manitoba. It has a collection of over 100 automobiles that date back to 1908.

Collection
The museum also has a collection of pioneer farm equipment, steam tractors, and unique household artifacts. Included in the museum's collection are a 1904 Holsman, a 1909 Metz, a 1914 Briscoe and a 1918 Gray-Dort. The collection also includes lesser-known automobiles such as the Maxwell and the Russel-Knight.

See also
Canadian Automotive Museum

Affiliations
The Museum is affiliated with: CMA,  CHIN, and Virtual Museum of Canada.

References

External links
 Manitoba Antique Automobile Museum

Transport museums in Manitoba
Automobile museums in Canada